The Yuneec EViva is a Chinese low-wing, two-seat motor glider that was designed by Martin Wezel is now under development by Yuneec International of Kunshan, Jiangsu.

Design and development
The EViva was originally designed by Martin Wezel in conjunction with the Czech company Composit and initially intended to be powered by a  Rotax 503 two-stroke or  HKS 700E four-stroke powerplant. The design was purchased by Yuneec, development shifted to China and the aircraft was adapted for electric power.

The aircraft was designed to comply with the Fédération Aéronautique Internationale microlight rules. It features a cantilever wing, a T-tail, a two-seats-in-side-by-side configuration enclosed cockpit under a bubble canopy, retractable monowheel gear with wing tip and tail casters, and a single electric motor in tractor configuration driving a folding propeller.

The aircraft is made from composites. The wing is derived from the Wezel Apis 2 wing. The standard engine fitted is the  Yuneec Power Drive 40 electric motor, controlled by a Yuneec Power Block 40 400 Amp power controller and powered by two Kokam Lithium polymer battery packs of 31 ampere hours (Ah) each (62 Ah total). The engine weighs , the controller  and the batteries weigh  in total. The propeller folds aft into the engine cooling vents when not in use and deploys automatically on engine start. The batteries are charged by a Yuneec E-Charger that can run on 110-240 volts and charge in 3–4 hours. The aircraft will come equipped with a Ballistic Recovery Systems ballistic parachute

Specifications (EViva)

See also

References

External links

2000s Chinese sailplanes
Electric aircraft
EViva